The Henry Gray Turner House, also known as Nocturne is a historic site in Quitman, Georgia. The estate, including the house, outbuildings, and grounds, was added to the National Register of Historic Places on January 8, 1980. The property is located at 802 Old Madison Road. The home is associated with Henry Gray Turner.

Construction
The plans are marked with Munn & Co., an early patent law firm whose owner Orson Desaix Munn became the publisher of Scientific American. The hand-drawn original plans on vellum were found in the home's attic and are displayed in the house. The home was constructed by T.J. Darling of Waycross, Georgia.

It is a two-story house.  Its grounds are also significant.

See also
National Register of Historic Places listings in Brooks County, Georgia

References

Houses on the National Register of Historic Places in Georgia (U.S. state)
Houses completed in 1895
Houses in Brooks County, Georgia
National Register of Historic Places in Brooks County, Georgia